2023 WDF season of darts comprises every tournament of World Darts Federation. The prize money of the tournaments may vary depending on category.

Two of WDF's most prestigious events are due to be held in 2023, WDF World Darts Championship (to be held in December), and WDF World Cup (to be held in September)

2023 is the third year in darts under WDF-sole management after the demise of BDO in 2020.

Tournament categories, points & prize money

Calendar

January

February

March

April

Statistical information

The players/nations are sorted by:
 Total number of titles;
 Cumulated importance of those titles;
 Alphabetical order (by family names for players).

Titles won by player (men's)

Titles won by nation (men's)

Titles won by player (women's)

Titles won by nation (women's)

References

External links
2023 WDF calendar

2023 in darts